The atomweight division in mixed martial arts generally refers to competitors weighing less than , depending on the promotion. It sits below the heavier strawweight division and is the lightest weight class widely recognized within MMA. The atomweight division in mixed martial arts is used almost exclusively for Women's MMA.

Ambiguity 
Fight Matrix classifies fighters at 110.9 lbs (50.3 kg) and under as atomweight.

 The Deep Jewels atomweight division has an upper limit of 47.6 kg (105 lbs). It was previously known as featherweight until May 2015.
 The Invicta Fighting Championships atomweight division is between 95 and 105 lbs (43 to 47.6 kg).
 The Pancrase atomweight division has an upper limit of 47.6 kg.
 The ONE Championship atomweight division is between 105 and 115 lbs (47.6 to 52.2 kg).
 The Road Fighting Championship atomweight division has an upper limit of 48 kg.
 The Shooto atomweight division has an upper limit of 47.6 kg.

History

Deep Jewels regularly holds contests at 47.6 kg and circulates a championship title. A tournament took place that culminated on December 17, 2011 at Jewels 17th Ring, where Naho Sugiyama defeated both Kikuyo Ishikawa and Misaki Takimoto on the same night to win the inaugural championship. Although now titled the atomweight class, the division was previously known as the featherweight class until May 2015.

Invicta held their inaugural atomweight title fight on October 6, 2012. The contest saw Jessica Penne defeating Naho Sugiyama by triangle choke in the second round.

ONE Championship held their inaugural atomweight championship title match on May 6, 2016. The fight saw Angela Lee defeat Mei Yamaguchi, and Lee still holds the title as of March 2022.

Road FC introduced an atomweight championship title on June 10, 2017. The match saw Seo Hee Ham defeat Mina Kurobe by TKO in the third round.

Shooto introduced an atomweight championship via a tournament that culminated on November 27, 2022, where Chihiro Sawada defeated Yuki Ono.

Professional champions

Current champions

See also
 List of current MMA Women's Atomweight Champions
 Mixed martial arts weight classes

References

Mixed martial arts weight classes
Women's mixed martial arts